Ahmed Rasheed (born 7 July 1988) is a Maldivian footballer, who has played for Club Eagles as a forward.

International career
Rasheed made his debut for the Maldives' senior team in their first match of 2012 Nehru Cup against Nepal on 23 August 2012, coming on to play in the 63rd minute, replacing his club teammate Assadhulla Abdulla. He also assisted the goal scored by Ismail Easa to increase the lead for his side to 2 goals.

Career statistics

International

International goals

Senior team
Scores and results list Maldives goal tally first.

References

1988 births
Living people
Maldivian footballers
Maldives international footballers
Association football forwards
Club Eagles players